Government palace may refer to:

 Tucumán Government Palace, Argentina
 Government Palace, Dili, East Timor
 Government Palace (Finland)
 Government Palace of Chihuahua, Mexico
 Government Palace (Mongolia)
 Government Palace (Peru)